Chananporn Rosjan, nicknamed Nod is a Thai pilot, model, and Miss Thailand Universe 2005 titleholder.

Biography
Rosjan was educated primarily at Ruamrudee International School in Bangkok, Thailand.

She moved to New York, United States with her family where her guardian was general consulate. She studied at the Francis Lewis High School and returned to Thailand to study at Sirindhorn International Institute of Technology at Thammasat University where she later received Bachelor of Electrical Engineering.

Besides Thai and English, Rosjan also speaks German and Italian.

Career
She represented Thailand in Junior World Golf Championships held in San Diego, California, between 1992 and 1996.

She now works as a pilot for Thai Air Asia.

Pageantry
On 29 March 2005, Rosjan won the coveted title of Miss Thailand Universe 2005 beating 43 other hopeful young women around the country.

She then went on to compete with 80 other beautiful young women from around the globe in the Miss Universe 2005 pageant held in her home country where she won Best National Costume Award.  She was one of the favourites to win the Miss Universe crown but did not place.  She was, however, the third Thai woman to win the pageant's Best National Costume Award, the others being Saengduan Manwong in 1969 and Porntip Nakhirunkanok in 1988.

References

External links
Crowning Moment
MU 2005
Sawasdee Pageant The Majestic World of Beauty Pageant
Photo as pilot in Thai AirAsia

1982 births
Living people
Miss Universe 2005 contestants
Chananporn Rosjan
Chananporn Rosjan
Chananporn Rosjan
Chananporn Rosjan
Chananporn Rosjan
Chananporn Rosjan